Jacqueline Bracamontes Van Hoorde (born 23 December 1979) is a Mexican actress, former model and beauty pageant titleholder who won Nuestra Belleza Jalisco 2000, Nuestra Belleza México 2000 and represented her country at Miss Universe 2001.

Early life
Bracamontes born in Guadalajara, Jalisco to Jesús Bracamontes, the former coach of the popular Mexican football team Chivas, and Jacqueline Van Hoorde. She is the oldest of three children. She has a sister Alina, and a brother, Jesus, Jr. Her father is currently a football analyst for the Hispanic-American television network Univision.

Pageant career
After seeing her on a magazine cover, ex-Miss Universe Lupita Jones contacted her and asked her to enter the Nuestra Belleza México. Bracamontes went on to win the state and national beauty titles and to represent Mexico in Miss Universe 2001, which took place in Puerto Rico.

Acting and hosting career
After being crowned Miss Mexico in 2000, Bracamontes decided to pursue a television career. She began her career hosting various award shows and special programs, including Acafest, Premios TVyNovelas and Fiesta Mexicana.

A soccer aficionado, in August 2008 she became host of a Mexican sports radio show on Vision AM, and was later invited by univision to be a host and correspondent of the 2002 FIFA World Cup. She has also worked with Televisa Deportes.

In 2003, she was cast in the Mexican telenovela Alegrijes y Rebujos, produced by Rosy Ocampo. One year later, she landed a role in the popular soap-opera Rubí, alongside Bárbara Mori and Eduardo Santamarina.

In 2006, she landed her first lead role in the Mexican novela Heridas de Amor, alongside Brazilian-born actor Guy Ecker. The program was broadcast in several countries.

In spring 2007, Bracamontes was cast in her first feature film, entitled Cuando Las Cosas Suceden, playing the role of a nun named Lucia. Later that year, she briefly returned to hosting with the Mexican game show De Por Vida, but the show was quickly cancelled.

In 2008, she starred in the comedic Mexican telenovela Las Tontas No Van al Cielo, alongside Jaime Camil, which was extremely successful in both the Latin American and United States market.

She lent her voice to the character of Susan Murphy in the Spanish-language version of Monsters vs. Aliens released in 2009.

After finishing filming with Las Tontas No Van al Cielo, she starred in Sortilegio, with Cuban actor William Levy. Filming was completed in October 2009.

Bracamontes was chosen as one of the killers in the popular series Mujeres Asesinas which premiered in the fall of 2010.

Bracamontes was the host from the second to the sixth edition of La Voz... México (2012 - 2014, 2016 - 2017). In 2019 she host the first season of La Voz and in 2020 the second one.

In 2018, Bracamontes was part of Telemundo network's coverage of the 2018 FIFA World Cup. She co-hosted the prime-time variety show "Viva el mundial y más".

Personal life
Bracamontes is a fan of Liga MX club Guadalajara. She married Martín Fuentes, a Mexican businessman and racetrack racer, on 1 October 2011 in Guadalajara. On 12 November 2012, Bracamontes and Fuentes announced in an exclusive interview with Caras magazine that Bracamontes was pregnant and she was expecting twins. Bracamontes gave birth to Fuentes' twin children, a boy, Martín, who died at birth due to respiratory complications, and a girl, Jacqueline, on 29 March 2013. On 15 December 2013, Bracamontes announced that she was pregnant with Fuentes' third child, and gave birth to a girl named Carolina on 9 July 2014. On 15 July 2016, she gave birth to Fuentes' fourth child, Renata. On December 20, 2018, she gave birth to another set of twins, Emilia and Paula.

Filmography

Film

Television

Theatre
 Un gallego en paris (2006)
 La obra hasta que la muerte nos separe (2008)
 Hasta que la boda nos separe (2009)

Awards and nominations

Premios TVyNovelas

Premios Juventud

Premios People en Español

References

External links
 
 

1979 births
21st-century Mexican actresses
Actresses from Guadalajara, Jalisco
Living people
Mexican female models
Mexican film actresses
Mexican people of Belgian descent
Mexican radio presenters
Mexican women radio presenters
Mexican stage actresses
Mexican telenovela actresses
Mexican television actresses
Miss Universe 2001 contestants
Nuestra Belleza México winners